"Offred" is the premiere episode of the American television drama series The Handmaid's Tale. It was directed by Reed Morano, and written by Bruce Miller, adapting material from the 1985 Margaret Atwood novel The Handmaid's Tale. The episode debuted on the streaming service Hulu on April 26, 2017.

The Handmaid's Tale is set in a near-future dystopia in which a mysterious epidemic of female infertility spontaneously affects women worldwide. The ensuing chaos results in a Dominionist Christian cult overtaking almost all of the United States, renaming it "Gilead" and enforcing a strictly patriarchal theocracy. The viewers follow a woman named June, more commonly known as "Offred" because she has been assigned to a man named "Fred" to bear him children. Fertile women such as June are known as "handmaids" and are forcibly conscripted to bear children for childless couples. Storytelling in the series is routinely non-linear as June has flashbacks to the time before Gilead's rise and a possible resistance movement.

"Offred" was released along with the second and third episodes of the series and the entire first season received widespread critical acclaim. Imagery from the series has also influenced political protests to the presidency of Donald Trump.

Plot

In a flashback sequence, June's family is pursued in the woods and armed men arrest her, kill her husband Luke, and abduct their child Hannah. Throughout the episode, viewers see subsequent flashbacks to June's detainment in a facility with other fertile women who are beaten and indoctrinated to believe that their destiny is to please God through being "handmaids"—women who are chosen to bear children for powerful couples who are infertile. Punishment is severe and strict for these women but also any other dissenters: academics, doctors, religious minorities (such as Catholics), and homosexuals.

In the present day, June is assigned to a new family and given the name "Offred"—all handmaids' names change to a construction "Of __", named after the male head of a household. Commander Fred Waterford is a powerful member of the ruling insurgency in Gilead. Offred is assigned mundane chores such as grocery shopping, and is periodically raped in "The Ceremony" wherein Waterford attempts to impregnate June while his wife Serena restrains her. Any time she is in public, she must wear modest clothing and refrain from eye contact with men; she is constantly accompanied by another handmaid called "Ofglen", whom June despises for Ofglen's piety. The streets are lined with armed guards and conspicuous black vans who abduct criminals in plain view to terrorize the populace.

One day, June and Ofglen attend a public ceremony at which a man accused of rape is to be killed. Handmaids are encouraged to savagely beat him in a "particicution" led by Aunt Lydia, the woman who abused them in the flashbacks. Offred gives into violent impulses and takes charge, kicking him to death. As she and Ofglen leave, Ofglen reveals that she does not believe in the theocratic cult ruling their lives and warns Offred that Offred's household has a spy known as an "Eye" who may report anything suspicious. This revelation empowers Offred to remember that her true name is June and to resolve to find Hannah.

Production
The series was announced by Hulu in April 2016, with Elisabeth Moss starring as Offred and serving as one of the producers. The adaptation was created by Bruce Miller, who is an executive producer with Warren Littlefield, Fran Sears, and Daniel Wilson. Miller also wrote the first three episodes and the season finale "Night". Atwood serves as consulting producer, giving feedback on some of the areas where the series expands upon or modernizes the book and has a small cameo role in "Offred". That June, Reed Morano was announced as director of the series and Ann Dowd, Max Minghella, and Samira Wiley joined the cast in July, followed by Madeline Brewer, Joseph Fiennes, and Yvonne Strahovski the following month, and by Amanda Brugel and O. T. Fagbenle in September. In October, Ever Carradine was announced as another actor, and Alexis Bledel was added in January 2017.

Filming for the first season took place in Toronto, Mississauga, Hamilton, Burlington, Oakville, and Cambridge, Ontario, from September 2016 to February 2017. The series premiered on April 26, 2017.

Reception

Critical reception
Critical assessment for the episode, first season, and series has been extremely positive. On review aggregator Rotten Tomatoes, the episode is assessed at 100% with an average rating of nine out of 10, based on 13 reviews, meaning that all critics surveyed recommended watching the episode.

Popular reception

At the time this aired, digital streaming services like Hulu had no third-party services that publish ratings, such as Nielsen Media Research ratings for traditional broadcast television. Nielsen added Hulu and YouTube TV in July 2017. The commercial success of the first few episodes can only be inferred by the network's decision to pick up a second season the same day that the fourth episode aired (the first three all debuted on April 26), announcing that "Offred" was the most-watched debut of any program on Hulu. Women's rights activists began dressing as handmaids for political protests within three weeks of "Offred" airing and the trend has continued for subsequent events such as Brett Kavanaugh's 2018 Supreme Court nomination hearing and it had become a viral phenomenon by 2019, similar to Guy Fawkes masks used by Anonymous protestors several years prior.

See also
List of original programs distributed by Hulu

References

External links

2017 American television episodes
American television series premieres
Emmy Award-winning episodes
The Handmaid's Tale (TV series)